Khalil Chemmam (born 24 July 1987) is a Tunisian retired professional footballer who played as a left back and centre back for Espérance de Tunis and Vitória de Guimarães.

Club career
Born in Tunis, Chemmam has played club football for Espérance Tunis, Vitória de Guimarães B and Vitória de Guimarães. He participated at the FIFA Club World Cup in 2011, 2018 and 2019.

International career
He earned 26 caps for the Tunisia national team between 2008 and 2013. In May 2018 he was named in Tunisia’s preliminary 29 man  squad for the 2018 World Cup in Russia.

References

1987 births
Living people
Footballers from Tunis
Tunisian footballers
Tunisia international footballers
Espérance Sportive de Tunis players
Vitória S.C. players
Tunisian Ligue Professionnelle 1 players
Primeira Liga players
Liga Portugal 2 players
Association football fullbacks
Tunisian expatriate footballers
Expatriate footballers in Portugal
2010 Africa Cup of Nations players
2012 Africa Cup of Nations players
2013 Africa Cup of Nations players

Tunisian expatriate sportspeople in Portugal